{{DISPLAYTITLE:C12H10N2}}
The molecular formula C12H10N2 (molar mass: 182.22 g/mol) may refer to:

 Azobenzene, a chemical compound composed of two phenyl rings linked by a N=N double bond
 Harmane, a heterocyclic amine found in a variety of foods
 9-Me-BC, a heterocyclic amine of the beta-carboline family